Health Services Research is a peer-reviewed healthcare journal published bimonthly by Wiley-Blackwell on behalf of the Health Research and Educational Trust. In addition, it is an official journal of AcademyHealth. The editor-in-chief is Austin Frakt (Boston University). The journal covers research, methods, and concepts related to the financing, organization, delivery, evaluation, and outcomes of health services.

According to the Journal Citation Reports, the journal has a 2020 impact factor of 3.402, ranking it 18th out of 88 journals in the category "Health Policy" and 38th out of 108 in "Health Care Sciences and Services".

References

External links 
 

Wiley-Blackwell academic journals
Bimonthly journals
Healthcare journals
Publications established in 1966
English-language journals